Collinsville is an unincorporated community and census-designated place (CDP) in Lauderdale County, Mississippi, United States. The population was 1,984 at the 2020 census.

Geography
Collinsville is located in northwestern Lauderdale County at  (32.487906, -88.844205). Mississippi Highway 19 passes through the community, leading southeast  to Meridian, the county seat, and northwest  to Philadelphia.

The town and Highway 19 lie on a low ridge separating Suqualena Creek to the west and Twitley Branch to the east, both of which are tributaries of Okatibbee Creek and part of the Chickasawhay/Pascagoula River watershed. Okatibbee Dam, forming  Okatibbee Lake, is at the eastern edge of the Collinsville CDP.

Demographics

As of the 2020 United States census, there were 1,984 people, 724 households, and 503 families residing in the CDP.

As of the census of 2000, there were 1,823 people, 701 households, and 541 families residing in the CDP. The population density was 115.7 people per square mile (44.7/km2). There were 739 housing units at an average density of 46.9/sq mi (18.1/km2). The racial makeup of the CDP was 86.56% White, 12.51% African American, 0.38% Asian, and 0.55% from two or more races. Hispanic or Latino of any race were 1.32% of the population.

There were 701 households, out of which 39.2% had children under the age of 18 living with them, 63.9% were married couples living together, 10.3% had a female householder with no husband present, and 22.8% were non-families. 21.4% of all households were made up of individuals, and 9.7% had someone living alone who was 65 years of age or older. The average household size was 2.60 and the average family size was 3.03.

In the CDP the population was spread out, with 26.8% under the age of 18, 6.4% from 18 to 24, 31.2% from 25 to 44, 23.3% from 45 to 64, and 12.4% who were 65 years of age or older. The median age was 36 years. For every 100 females there were 100.1 males. For every 100 females age 18 and over, there were 91.9 males.

The median income for a household in the CDP was $33,476, and the median income for a family was $41,714. Males had a median income of $31,779 versus $21,957 for females. The per capita income for the CDP was $17,184. About 5.4% of families and 8.9% of the population were below the poverty line, including 7.2% of those under age 18 and 20.5% of those age 65 or over.

Notable people
 Lane Burroughs, college baseball coach
 Ross A. Collins, congressman from Mississippi
 Austin Davis, former NFL quarterback
 Winifred Hamrick Farrar, Mississippi's poet laureate from 1978 to 2010
 Jennifer Gambatese, actress and singer
 Jimmy Ruffin, soul and R&B singer

References

Census-designated places in Lauderdale County, Mississippi